The Borough of Chesterfield is a non-metropolitan district with borough status in Derbyshire, England. It is named after its main settlement of Chesterfield.

History
The district was formed on 1 April 1974, under the Local Government Act 1972, by a merger of the Municipal Borough of Chesterfield, Staveley Urban District and the Brimington part of Chesterfield Rural District.

The borough's main two towns are Chesterfield and Staveley. With its geographical position, the borough offers convenient commuter links to the cities of Sheffield, Nottingham, Derby, Bradford, Wakefield, Manchester, Salford, Leeds and Lincoln, and via its mainline railway station at Chesterfield and the connections to the M1 motorway.

Geography
The borough is situated around the town of Chesterfield and includes the villages of Old Whittington, Brimington (which also has a parish council), Sheepbridge and New Whittington, and the town of Staveley which maintains a town council.

The borough is bordered by North East Derbyshire district to the north, west and south and Bolsover district to the east. These districts include towns and villages such as Clay Cross, Wingerworth, Calow, Holymoorside, Dronfield, Mastin Moor, Barlborough, Bolsover and Grassmoor. Mansfield in Nottinghamshire is 12 miles southeast, Worksop is 20 miles northeast and Buxton is 25 miles west.

Travel to Work Areas
Chesterfield and its surrounding borough are situated around multiple travel to work areas which span from the counties of Greater Manchester, South Yorkshire, West Yorkshire and Nottinghamshire as well as Derbyshire. The cities of Nottingham, Manchester, Derby, Wakefield and Sheffield are the closest cities to Chesterfield and its surrounding borough.

Suburbs
Suburbs of Chesterfield include:

Birdholme
Boythorpe
Brampton
Hasland
Newbold
Spital
Tapton
Whittington Moor

Governance

Chesterfield is currently overall controlled by the Labour Party. The borough is along with Bolsover District, North East Derbyshire, Derbyshire Dales and Bassetlaw District, a non-constituent member of the South Yorkshire Combined Authority.

References

Sources
Chesterfield Borough Council - Home
Map and Details for Chesterfield Borough Council Local Authority
chesterfield borough council Archives
Chesterfield Borough Council
The Borough of Chesterfield (Electoral Changes) Order 1999
Your Councillors
History
Story of Chesterfield
Our Town in History
Chesterfield | England, United Kingdom
Genuki: Chesterfield, Derbyshire
History of Chesterfield: Early and medieval Chesterfield
Chesterfield - Town
Chesterfield (District, United Kingdom) - Population Statistics, Charts, Map and Location
Chesterfield Registration District
Chesterfield District – DDA
New executive directors appointed at Chesterfield Borough Council
Chesterfield Borough Council
The Derbyshire (District Boundaries) Order 1988

 
Non-metropolitan districts of Derbyshire
Boroughs in England